José Teixeira may refer to:

José Teixeira (football manager) (1935-2018), Brazilian football manager
José Roberto Magalhães Teixeira (1937–1996), Brazilian politician

See also
Josué Teixeira (born 1960), Brazilian football manager
Diogo Dalot or José Diogo Dalot Teixeira (born 1999), Portuguese professional footballer 
Teixeira (disambiguation)